Luca herbida is a moth of the family Notodontidae first described by Francis Walker in 1862. It is found in Brazil.

References

Moths described in 1862
Notodontidae